This is a list of species in Stegana, a genus of vinegar flies in the family Drosophilidae.

Stegana species

 Stegana acantha  g
 Stegana acutangula (Hendel, 1913) c g
 Stegana adentata Toda & Peng, 1992 c g
 Stegana affinis Malloch, 1924 c g
 Stegana africana Malloch, 1934 c g
 Stegana alianya Zhang & Chen, 2021
 Stegana ancistrophylla  g
 Stegana angulata Chen & Chen g
 Stegana annulata Haliday, 1833 c g
 Stegana annulosa (Duda, 1929) c g
 Stegana antica Curran, 1934 c g
 Stegana antigua Wheeler, 1960 i c g
 Stegana antila Sidorenko & Okada, 1991 g
 Stegana antlia Okada, 1991 c g
 Stegana aotsukai Chen & Wang, 2004 c g
 Stegana apicopubescens  g
 Stegana apicosetosa  g
 Stegana arcygramma Chen & Chen, 2008 c g
 Stegana atrifrons Malloch, 1924 c g
 Stegana atrimana Malloch, 1924 c g
 Stegana bacilla Chen & Aotsuka, 2004 c g
 Stegana baechlii Lastovka & Maca, 1982 c g
 Stegana barretti Johnson, 1921 i
 Stegana belokobylskiji Sidorenko, 1997 c g
 Stegana bicoloripes Tsacas, 1990 c g
 Stegana biprotrusa Chen & Aotsuka, 2004 c g
 Stegana brasiliensis (Duda, 1927) c
 Stegana brevibarba Cao & Chen, 2008 c g
 Stegana brunnea Malloch, 1924 c g
 Stegana burmensis Sidorenko, 1997 c g
 Stegana capillaria Cao & Chen, 2008 c g
 Stegana castanea Okada, 1988 c g
 Stegana cheni Sidorenko, 1997 c g
 Stegana chitouensis Sidorenko, 1998 c g
 Stegana claudana Bock, 1982 c g
 Stegana coleoptrata (Scopoli, 1763) i c g
 Stegana conformis Malloch, 1924 c g
 Stegana consimilis Papp & Maca, 2000 c g
 Stegana convergens (Meijere, 1911) c g
 Stegana crescentica Gupta & Panigrahy, 1987 c g
 Stegana cristimana Malloch, 1924 c g
 Stegana ctenaria Nishiharu, 1979 c g
 Stegana curvinervis (Hendel, 1914) c g
 Stegana danbaensis  g
 Stegana dendrobium Chen & Aotsuka, 2004 c g
 Stegana dentifera Lastovka and Maca, 1982 i c g
 Stegana dianensis  g
 Stegana diodonta  Zhang & Chen, 2021
 Stegana dorsolineata Duda, 1925 c g
 Stegana earli Bock, 1982 c g
 Stegana emeiensis Sidorenko, 1997 c g
 Stegana enigma Sidorenko, 1998 c g
 Stegana flavifrons Malloch, 1924 c g
 Stegana flavimana Malloch, 1924 c g
 Stegana fumipennis (Enderlein, 1922) c g
 Stegana furta (Linnaeus, 1767) c g
 Stegana fuscibasis Malloch, 1924 c g
 Stegana glabra  g
 Stegana hirtipenis Xu, Gao & Chen, 2007 c g
 Stegana horae Williston, 1896 c g
 Stegana hypoleuca Meigen, 1830 c g
 Stegana ikedai Okada & Sidorenko, 1992 c g
 Stegana intermedia (Duda, 1927) c g
 Stegana interrupta Malloch, 1924 c g
 Stegana izu Sidorenko, 1997 c g
 Stegana kanmiyai Okada & Sidorenko, 1992 c g
 Stegana lamondi Bock, 1982 c g
 Stegana langufoliacea  g
 Stegana lateralis Wulp, 1897 c g
 Stegana latipenis Xu, Gao & Chen, 2007 c g
 Stegana leucomelana (Walker, 1859) c g
 Stegana longibarba Cao & Chen, 2008 c g
 Stegana longifibula Takada, 1968 c g
 Stegana magnifica Hendel, 1913 c g
 Stegana maichouensis Sidorenko, 1998 c g
 Stegana masanoritodai Okada & Sidorenko, 1992 c g
 Stegana mediospinosa  g
 Stegana mehadiae Duda, 1924 c g
 Stegana meichiensis Chen & Toda, 1994 c g
 Stegana melanostigma Chen & Chen, 2008 c g
 Stegana melanostoma Chen & Chen, 2008 c g
 Stegana minor Duda, 1927 c g
 Stegana monochrous Tsacas, 1990 c g
 Stegana monodonata Chen & Chen, 2008 c g
 Stegana montana  g
 Stegana moritha Sidorenko, 1997 c g
 Stegana multiclavata Cao & Chen, 2008 c g
 Stegana nainitalensis Singh & Fartyal, 2002 c g
 Stegana nartshukae Sidorenko, 1997 c g
 Stegana nigrifrons Meijere, 1911 c g
 Stegana nigrimana Malloch, 1924 c g
 Stegana nigripennis (Hendel, 1914) c g
 Stegana nigrita Malloch, 1924 c g
 Stegana nigrithorax Strobl, 1898 c g
 Stegana nigrolimbata Duda, 1924 c g
 Stegana nigromarginata Duda, 1925 c g
 Stegana norma Curran, 1934 c g
 Stegana oligochaeta  g
 Stegana ornatipes Wheeler & Takada, 1964 c g
 Stegana otocondyloda  g
 Stegana pallipes Wiedemann, 1830 c g
 Stegana papuana Okada & Sidorenko, 1992 c g
 Stegana parvispina  g
 Stegana penihexata Gupta & Panigrahy, 1987 c g
 Stegana pianmaensis  g
 Stegana pililobosa Chen & Chen, 2008 c g
 Stegana planifacies Malloch, 1924 c g
 Stegana platypezina (Duda, 1927) c g
 Stegana plesia Tsacas & Chassagnard, 1996 c g
 Stegana prigenti Chen & Wang, 2004 c g
 Stegana protuberans  g
 Stegana proximata (Seguy, 1938) c g
 Stegana psilolobosa Chen & Chen, 2008 c g
 Stegana pyinoolwinensis Sidorenko, 1997 c g
 Stegana scarabeo Bock, 1982 c g
 Stegana schildi Malloch, 1924 c g
 Stegana scutellata Meijere, 1911 c g
 Stegana setifrons Sidorenko, 1997 c g
 Stegana shirozui Okada, 1971 c g
 Stegana sibirica (Duda, 1934) c g
 Stegana sidorenkoi Hu & Toda, 1994 c g
 Stegana similis Lastovka & Maca, 1982 c g
 Stegana singularis Sidorenko, 1990 c g
 Stegana sinica Sidorenko, 1991 c g
 Stegana spyrotsakasi Tsacas, 1997 c g
 Stegana stuckenbergi Tsacas, 1990 c g
 Stegana subconvergens Okada, 1988 c g
 Stegana subexcavata Vaidya & Godbole, 1976 c g
 Stegana taba Okada, 1971 c g
 Stegana taiwana Okada, 1991 c g
 Stegana tarsalis Williston, 1896 c g
 Stegana tempifera Malloch, 1924 c g
 Stegana tenebrosa (Walker, 1865) c g
 Stegana tentaculifera  g
 Stegana toyaensis Okada & Sidorenko, 1992 c g
 Stegana triseta (Duda, 1925) c g
 Stegana trisetosa Chen & Wang, 2004 c g
 Stegana undulata Meijere, 1911 c g
 Stegana unidentata Takada, 1968 c g
 Stegana uniformis Malloch, 1924 c g
 Stegana varicolor (Duda, 1925) c g
 Stegana varipes Tsacas, 1990 c g
 Stegana vietnamensis Sidorenko, 1997 c g
 Stegana vittata (Coquillett, 1901) i c g b
 Stegana watabei Sidorenko, 1998 c g
 Stegana wheeleri Lastovka and Maca, 1982 i c g
 Stegana xiaoleiae Cao & Chen, 2008 c g
 Stegana xishuangbanna  g
 Stegana xuei Hu & Toda, 1994 c g
 Stegana yapingi Chen & Wang, 2004 c g
 Stegana zebromyia Zhang & Chen, 2021'
 Stegana zhangi Sidorenko, 1997 c g
 Stegana zopheria Zhang & Chen, 2021

Data sources: i = ITIS, c = Catalogue of Life, g = GBIF, b = Bugguide.net

References

Stegana
Articles created by Qbugbot